Diamond Frontier is a 1940 American adventure film directed by Harold D. Schuster and starring Victor McLaglen, John Loder and Anne Nagel. It was based on the story A Modern Monte Cristo by Stanley Rubin and Edmund L. Hartmann. The film's sets were designed by the art director Jack Otterson.

Plot
A man tries to enforce the law in a rowdy South African diamond-mining town.

Principal cast
 Victor McLaglen as Terrence Regan 
 John Loder as Doctor Charles Clayton 
 Anne Nagel as Jeanne Krueger 
 Cecil Kellaway as Noah 
 Philip Dorn as Jan Stafford De Winter 
 Francis Ford as Derek Bluje 
 Lionel Belmore as Piet Bloem 
 Evelyn Selbie as Julia Bloem 
 Hugh Sothern as Travers 
 Ferris Taylor as Paul Willem 
 J. Anthony Hughes as Matt Campbell

References

External links

1940 films
1940s historical adventure films
1940s English-language films
Films directed by Harold D. Schuster
Universal Pictures films
Films set in South Africa
Films set in the 19th century
American historical adventure films
American black-and-white films
Films scored by Hans J. Salter
1940s American films